Disappear Here may refer to:

 Disappear Here (Silver Sun album), 2005
 Disappear Here (Hybrid album), 2010
 Disappear Here (Bad Suns album), 2016
 Disappear Here (EP), a 1992 EP by Peach
 Disappear Here, a 2005 album by LA Symphony